Cyperus compressus, commonly known as annual sedge, is a sedge of the family Cyperaceae that has a wide distribution throughout countries with warmer climates. It is found in tropical areas of Africa, Asia and the Americas.

In Europe it is commonly known as hedgehog sedge and the French know it as souchet comprimé. In India it is called mothi and in Japan it is known as kugugayatsuri.

Description
It blooms between May and December and produces green-yellow-brown flowers. The erect and glabrous grass has fine and numerous roots. Red-purple, loose, open leaf sheaths cover the base of the plant with the leaves being much sorter than the stems. Following flowering it will form a dark brown to black trigonous nut that has a broad-obovoid shape.

Taxonomy
The species was first described by Carl Linnaeus in 1753 as a part of the work Species Plantarum. It has 11 synonyms including Cyperus brachiatus, Cyperus caffer, Cyperus giraudyi , Cyperus meyenii and Cyperus pectiniformis.

Distribution
It has a wide distribution throughout tropical and sub tropical parts of Asia, especially in India, Malaysia, Pakistan and the Philippines. It is found through much of Africa from Egypt to Zimbabwe. In the Americas it is found in the southern USA, Honduras, Costa Rica and Suriname as well as northern parts of  South America. It is also found in Fiji and New Guinea. It is a pantropical species, mostly found in moist places such as irrigated fields,  ditches, stream beds, pond margins and lawns. It grows in many soil types usually sandy or alluvial and clay soils.

It has become introduced in many areas, in Western Australia it is found in damp areas in the Kimberley region. It is also found in Queensland, New South Wales and the Northern Territory.

See also
List of Cyperus species

References

Plants described in 1753
Taxa named by Carl Linnaeus
compressus
Flora of Western Australia
Flora of Queensland
Flora of New South Wales
Flora of the Northern Territory
Flora of Afghanistan
Flora of Alabama
Flora of Angola
Flora of Arkansas
Flora of Assam (region)
Flora of Bangladesh
Flora of Belize
Flora of Benin
Flora of Bolivia
Flora of Borneo
Flora of Botswana
Flora of Brazil
Flora of Burkina Faso
Flora of Cambodia
Flora of Cameroon
Flora of Cape Verde
Flora of the Central African Republic
Flora of China
Flora of Colombia
Flora of Costa Rica
Flora of Cuba
Flora of Delaware
Flora of the Dominican Republic
Flora of Ecuador
Flora of Egypt
Flora of El Salvador
Flora of Ethiopia
Flora of Florida
Flora of French Guiana
Flora of Gabon
Flora of the Gambia
Flora of Georgia (U.S. state)
Flora of Ghana
Flora of Guatemala
Flora of Guyana
Flora of Hainan
Flora of Haiti
Flora of Honduras
Flora of Illinois
Flora of India
Flora of Ivory Coast
Flora of Jamaica
Flora of Japan
Flora of Java
Flora of Kentucky
Flora of Kenya
Flora of Korea
Flora of Laos
Flora of Liberia
Flora of Louisiana
Flora of Madagascar
Flora of Malawi
Flora of Mali
Flora of Maryland
Flora of Mauritius
Flora of Mexico
Flora of Mississippi
Flora of Missouri
Flora of Mozambique
Flora of Myanmar
Flora of Namibia
Flora of Nepal
Flora of New Guinea
Flora of New Mexico
Flora of New York (state)
Flora of Nicaragua
Flora of Nigeria
Flora of North Carolina
Flora of Ohio
Flora of Pakistan
Flora of Panama
Flora of Pennsylvania
Flora of Peru
Flora of the Philippines
Flora of Puerto Rico
Flora of Samoa
Flora of Senegal
Flora of Seychelles
Flora of Sierra Leone
Flora of South Carolina
Flora of Somalia
Flora of Sri Lanka
Flora of Sudan
Flora of Sulawesi
Flora of Sumatra
Flora of Suriname
Flora of Swaziland
Flora of Taiwan
Flora of Tanzania
Flora of Thailand
Flora of Texas
Flora of Tibet
Flora of Togo
Flora of Tonga
Flora of Trinidad
Flora of Uganda
Flora of Venezuela
Flora of Vietnam
Flora of Virginia
Flora of Zambia
Flora of Zimbabwe
Flora of the Democratic Republic of the Congo